Shigeaki Kato ( Katō Shigeaki; 11 June 1947 – 17 August 2022) was a Japanese politician. A member of the Japan Socialist Party, he served in the House of Representatives representing the 2nd District of Kagawa prefecture from 1990 to 1993.

Kato died on 17 August 2022, at the age of 75.

References

1947 births
2022 deaths
Social Democratic Party (Japan) politicians
Members of the House of Representatives (Japan)
Politicians from Kagawa Prefecture